The Canon lourd de 12 Gribeauval (Gribeauval heavy 12-pounder cannon) was a French cannon and part of the Gribeauval system developed by Jean Baptiste Vaquette de Gribeauval. It was part of the siege artillery.

The canon lourd de 12 Gribeauval was used extensively during the wars following the French Revolution, as well as the Napoleonic wars.

Some of the earlier Gribeauval siege guns kept the baroque "dolphin" design for the handles.

See also

Notes

Artillery of France